St. Mary's (Whitechapel Road) was a station on the District and Metropolitan lines of the London Underground. It was located between Whitechapel and Aldgate East stations, in the East End of London.

It was opened in 1884 on the Metropolitan and Metropolitan District Joint Railway, and served initially, albeit briefly, by the South Eastern Railway, then and for much of its existence jointly by the Metropolitan Railway and the District Railway; the route is now served by the District and Hammersmith & City lines. The station was closed in 1938 in advance of the relocation of Aldgate East to within minimal distance, rendering St. Mary's inessential. The station building was severely damaged during the Blitz of the Second World War and subsequently was demolished.

History

Opened on 3 March 1884 as St. Mary's (Whitechapel), the station was on the Metropolitan and Metropolitan District Joint Railway, and initially used by the South Eastern Railway; this service was withdrawn on 1 October 1884 and one week later the services were taken over jointly by the Metropolitan Railway and the District Railway. The station was small and cramped, and was located very close to both Whitechapel and Aldgate East stations, just before the junction to the East London Line.

In 1938, Aldgate East was relocated further eastwards and given a new entrance only a few hundred yards from St. Mary's (Whitechapel Road) rendering the latter surplus to requirements. It was permanently closed after the last train on 30 April 1938 in advance of the resiting of Aldgate East.

During the Second World War, the station site was leased from London Transport by the Metropolitan Borough of Stepney for use as an air-raid shelter. The edges of the platforms were bricked up to separate the shelter areas from the still-used tracks. On 22 October 1940, during the early months of the Blitz, the street-level station building was hit by a bomb and severely damaged. Its temporary replacement was also hit a few months later. The structure was subsequently demolished, hence little evidence of the station's existence now remains above ground, and its site is occupied by a car dealership.

The bricked-up platforms are still accessible to London Underground staff via an anonymous door off Whitechapel Road. Below ground, it is still possible to make out where the station was, as the barrel-vaulted roof and bricked-off platforms are still just visible from passing trains. Sometimes, trains travelling from Whitechapel to Aldgate East are held at signals, resulting in the train stopping abreast of the old St. Mary's platform.

St. Mary's Curve
The connection line leading to the old East London Line is still called the St. Mary's Curve. For many years the line was only used to transfer rolling stock between the East London and Metropolitan lines. Loading gauge restrictions for the stock meant that, although the curve was double tracked, trains could only pass in one direction at any one time. When illuminated, it can easily be seen from the left-hand side of East London Line trains entering Whitechapel from the south and can still be seen from the right-hand side of District line trains entering the station from the west. Since re-opening as part of the London Overground in 2010, the former East London Line no longer shares rolling stock with the Metropolitan line. As a result, St. Mary's Curve is no longer used, but the tunnel still exists. The points at St. Mary's Curve were removed in 2009.

References

External links

 Abandoned Stations - St. Mary's (Whitechapel Road)

 BBC News - Rare tour inside an abandoned tube station

District line stations
Former buildings and structures in the London Borough of Tower Hamlets
Hammersmith & City line stations
Disused London Underground stations
Former Metropolitan and Metropolitan District Joint Railway stations
Railway stations in Great Britain opened in 1884
Railway stations in Great Britain closed in 1938
Buildings and structures in Whitechapel
1884 establishments in England
1938 disestablishments in England
Railway stations located underground in the United Kingdom